Matamata Swifts AFC is a semi-professional association football club in Matamata, New Zealand.

Matamata Swifts competes in the WaiBOP SoccerShop Premiership. The club will also compete in the Chatham Cup, having reached a record last 32 position in New Zealand's only national cup competition. 
In the 2021 season, The Swifts finished 10th in the WAIBOP Soccer Shop Premiership, narrowly avoiding relegation to the Championship.

History
Matamata Swifts Association Football Club was established in 1930 and football has been played at different levels and with varying success every year since.

In 2019, Matamata Swifts AFC fielded four senior teams (three men and one ladies), nine junior teams (players aged 8 to 12) and eight mini-kickers teams (players aged 4 to 7). The club supports football at Matamata College, which fielded five youth teams in 2019. Matamata's historical rivals are Te Awamutu AFC.

Current squad

Honours
 2010 Promotion to Lotto NRFL Division 1
 2009 Waikato Bay of Plenty Football Federation Division 1, Winners
 2008 Waikato Bay of Plenty Football Federation Division 1, Runners-Up
 2007 Waikato Bay of Plenty Football Federation Division 1, Runners-Up
 2006 Waikato Premier League, Winners
 2006 Caper Cup, Winners
 2005 Waikato Premier League, Winners
 1995 Northern League Division 4, Runners-Up
 1994 Northern League Division 4, Runners-Up
 1985 Northern League Division 4 (South), Winners

References

External links
 UltimateNZSoccer website's Matamata Swifts page
Club website

Association football clubs in New Zealand
1930 establishments in New Zealand
Matamata